Mackenzie was a federal electoral district in Saskatchewan, Canada, that was represented in the House of Commons of Canada from 1904 to  1997.

This riding was created in 1903, when Saskatchewan was still a part of the Northwest Territories. In 1905, when Saskatchewan was created, the district was retained in the province.

The riding was abolished in 1996, and parts of it were merged into the districts of Blackstrap, Churchill River, Prince Albert, Qu'Appelle, Regina—Lumsden—Lake Centre, Saskatoon—Humboldt and Yorkton—Melville.

Members of Parliament

Mackenzie elected the following Members of Parliament:

 Edward L. Cash, Liberal (1904–1917)
 John Flaws Reid, Unionist (1917–1921)
 Milton Campbell, Progressive (1921–1933)
 John Angus MacMillan, Liberal (1933–1940)
 Alexander Nicholson (first term), Co-operative Commonwealth Federation (CCF) (1945–1949)
 Gladstone Ferrie, Liberal (1949–1953)
 Alexander Nicholson (second term), CCF (1953–1958)
 Stanley Korchinski, Progressive Conservative (1958–1984)
 Jack Scowen, Progressive Conservative (1984–1988)
 Vic Althouse, New Democrat (1988–1997)

Election results

See also 

 List of Canadian federal electoral districts
 Past Canadian electoral districts

External links 
 
 

Former federal electoral districts of Northwest Territories
Former federal electoral districts of Saskatchewan